Thor Girl (also known as Tarene Olson) is a superheroine appearing in American comic books published by Marvel Comics. Created by writer Dan Jurgens and artist John Romita Jr., the character first appeared in Thor vol. 2 #22 (April 2000).

Publication history

Created by writer Dan Jurgens and artist John Romita Jr., Tarene first appeared in Thor vol. 2 #22 (April 2000).

Thor Girl was one of the feature characters in the 2011 six-issue limited series Fear Itself: Youth in Revolt.

Fictional character biography
In the beginning of time, an alien sorcerer named X'Hoss foretold the creation of the Designate, who will help evolve sentient beings to the next level of existence. Billions of years later, Tarene is born. She is told about the fate of the evil Destroyer and together with others seeks a way to stop him. In the meantime, Thanos (later retconned as a clone) obtains X'Hoss' knowledge and destroys Tarene's home-world. With Thor's help, she defeats him.

Tarene later transforms herself into an Asgardian goddess and becomes Thor's loyal ally, taking the name "Thor Girl" and the human identity of Jake Olson's "cousin" Tara. She tries to assist Thor in his adventures, aiding him in his confrontations with Gladiator, and Nullitor. She is transferred into the shell of the Destroyer by Loki, causing her to fight Thor. With the help of Amora, they find Tarene's body and Odin casts her back into her body, where she takes her vengeance on Loki. In a later battle against a revived Surtur she sacrifices nearly all of her cosmic powers to contribute the additional power needed to defeat him. Upon Odin's apparent death, Thor Girl loses most of her cosmic powers. She retains the powers she had as Thor Girl. She returns to Earth in an attempt to live a normal life as Tara Olson, but is also seen adventuring occasionally. She knows that she is destined to, and one day will, regain her full power and then some, to become the Designate.

Civil War/The Initiative
Thor Girl is one of the heroes who registers with the Superhuman Registration Act that was forged during the 2006-2007 "Civil War" storyline. After the Superhuman Registration Act is passed, Thor Girl interferes in a jewel theft undertaken by the Grey Gargoyle, a previous foe of hers, and dispatches him, preventing the jewel heist in the process. In return, the Grey Gargoyle undertakes a lawsuit with the assistance of Mallory Book at the Superhuman Law Offices of Goodman, Lieber, Kurtzberg & Holliway.

Thor Girl is one of the first recruits for the Camp Hammond training facility. Other trainees included: Bengal, Cloud 9, Slapstick, Trauma, Armory, Rage, and Komodo.

The Initiative recruits are sent as crowd control in Manhattan with Thor Girl aiding mass evacuation when the city is attacked by the Hulk, who is seeking revenge upon the Illuminati. However, Rage breaks ranks to try to help the Avengers in battle against the Hulk and his Warbound, and Thor Girl is among the trainees who sides with Rage. Easily defeated, Thor Girl and the others are imprisoned at Manhattan Square Gardens and controlled by obedience disks. The Initiative's black ops team, including the empathic metamorph Trauma, are sent in to free Thor Girl and her compatriots, with Trauma assuming the form and powers of Thor as he battles the Warbound, leaving Thor Girl awestruck by the encounter.

Subsequent to Trauma's assumption of Thor's form, Thor Girl has expressed a kind of hero worship of and becomes enamored with Trauma. However, both Tarene and Trauma are brutally attacked by the MVP clone, calling himself KIA (Killed In Action). Tarene is badly burned while protecting Trauma, who is then stabbed in the chest by KIA.

Thor Girl recovers fairly quickly. At first, she assists in a mass super-human effort dedicated to rebuilding New York. Later, she is assigned together with Ultra Girl to the Cavalry, Georgia's local superhero team, once her Initiative training is complete.

Secret Invasion
During the Secret Invasion storyline, the Skrull Dum Dum Dugan calls all the sleeper agents in the Initiative, causing Ultra Girl and Thor Girl to fight each other out of fear. When the Skrull Kill Krew arrives to the scene, 3-D Man confirms that Thor Girl is a Skrull, killing her with her own hammer with the help of Gravity. It is unclear at this point how long the Skrull agent had been impersonating Thor Girl.

After the invasion is over, the real Thor Girl is shown in a support group meeting with the others that had been replaced by Skrulls. She attends a therapy session with Trauma, when Camp Hammond is attacked by the Thor clone Ragnarok. The clone beats Thor Girl badly, until Gauntlet intervenes.

Fear Itself
During the Fear Itself storyline, Thor Girl joins Steve Rogers' New Initiative, under Prodigy's leadership. She is quite confused about why Odin took all of the Asgardians back to the Asgard Realm, and is still deciding as to whether she should join them. While saving some people in the city, she is attacked because she has a hammer similar to those which had been appearing all around the earth, and accidentally kills a police officer who shot at her by deflecting the bullets back into him. At Prodigy's request she turns herself in and is kept in a holding cell. But when she is accosted by men outside the cell, who attempted to interrogate her as to the nature of the Worthy, Cloud 9 arrives to rescue her and subdues the men. After defeating Quicksand, who was on a murder spree, they joined in the battle against Juggernaut, who was transformed into Kuurth: Breaker of Stone, in Las Vegas and rescued civilians. Due to a misunderstanding she was attacked by the other heroes, despite her attempts to explain herself or she was only acting in defense. During the battle, her designate powers returned. She declared Earth's heroes to be little better than those who tortured her and as a whole proof that humanity is still too flawed to be worthy of ascending. She left Earth for the stars.

Powers, abilities, and equipment
As Thor Girl, Tarene possesses the conventional physical attributes of Asgardian gods. She is highly durable, able to withstand attacks that would destroy an ordinary human. If she were somehow wounded in battle, her godly life-force enables faster recovery time. Thor Girl has immense strength, which rivals even the most powerful gods and this now Asgardian-level metabolism provides her with greater stamina than normal beings. Additionally, like most Asgardians, she is also effectively immortal and immune to all Earth-based diseases. When she had her cosmic powers, the full extent of them are unknown, but closely rivaled to Odin's.

Tarene's Hammer
Thor Girl wields a golden hammer through when thrown, she can channel her energies as continuous beams, capable of knocking Thor off his feet and shattering buildings. Like Thor, she can also utilize it to fly, control the weather, and traverse dimensional barriers, such as from Earth to Asgard.

Reception

Accolades 

 In 2019, CBR.com ranked Thor Girl 9th in their "15 Craziest Versions Of Thor" list.
 In 2020, CBR.com ranked Thor Girl 1st in their "Avengers: The 10 Most Powerful Recruits From The Fifty State Initiative" list.
 In 2022, Screen Rant included Thor Girl in their "Marvel Comics: 15 Most Powerful Enchanted Hammer Users (Who Aren’t Thor)" list.
 In 2022, CBR.com ranked Thor Girl 19th in their "20 Strongest Versions Of Thor" list.

Other versions
In one alternate future world, Thor Girl tried to reach back in time to empower the alien Desak trying to locate a missing Thor.

In other media

Video games
 Thor Girl appears as a playable character in Lego Marvel's Avengers voiced by Kate Higgins.

References

External links

Thor Girl at Marvel.com

Comics characters introduced in 2000
Characters created by John Romita Jr.
Marvel Comics Asgardians
Marvel Comics characters who can move at superhuman speeds
Marvel Comics characters who use magic
Marvel Comics characters with accelerated healing
Marvel Comics characters with superhuman strength
Marvel Comics extraterrestrial superheroes
Characters created by Dan Jurgens
Fictional characters with electric or magnetic abilities
Fictional characters with energy-manipulation abilities
Fictional characters with immortality
Fictional characters with superhuman durability or invulnerability
Fictional characters with weather abilities
Fictional hammer fighters
Fictional women soldiers and warriors
Marvel Comics female superheroes